Diaphania magdalenae is a moth in the family Crambidae. It was described by George Hampson in 1899. It is found in Mexico, Costa Rica, Colombia, Venezuela, Ecuador and Brazil.

The length of the forewings is 11.3–12 mm. Adults are similar to Diaphania hyalinata, but the internal edge of the terminal band in both wings is crenulate (scalloped).

References

Moths described in 1899
Diaphania